Krautheim can refer to:

 Krautheim, a town in the Hohenlohe district in Baden-Württemberg
 Krautheim, Thuringia, a former municipality of Weimarer Land
 Krautheim (Volkach), district of Volkach, Bavaria
 Salm-Reifferscheid-Krautheim, a German statelet